Dancing master may refer to:

 The Dancing Master, a dance manual, first published by John Playford in 1651
 Dancing master, an early term for a dance teacher, or perhaps a choreographer
 The Compleat Dancing Master, a 1974 English folk rock album, by Ashley Hutchings with John Kirkpatrick and others
 "Dancing Master", a song on John Entwistle's 1981 album Too Late the Hero

See also
Dance